William Joseph Takacs (born December 23, 1973) is the principal trumpet of the Amarillo Symphony Orchestra and trumpet instructor at West Texas A&M University.

Early life and education
Takacs was born in Philadelphia, Pennsylvania. He received his Bachelor of Music degree from West Chester University of Pennsylvania in 1995, his Master of Music degree from Bowling Green State University, 1998, with the thesis An Examination of Gustav Mahler's Life and Fifth Symphony, with a Focus on the Trumpet Part, and his Doctorate of Music from Florida State University in 2003, with the dissertation Russian Trumpet Music – An Analysis of Concerti by Oskar Böhme, Eino Tamberg, and Sergeï Wassilenko.

Awards
Takacs won the 1999 National Trumpet Competition at George Mason University in Washington D.C., and was one of five semifinalists in the 2000 Ellsworth Smith International Trumpet Competition held in Bad Säckingen, Germany, sponsored by the International Trumpet Guild.

Performances and associations
He has made guest performance appearances with the Toledo, Ohio, Pensacola, and Tallahassee Symphony Orchestras and has performed across the United States, Europe, South America, Asia, and Australia. He performed as guest principal trumpet for the New Sigmund Romberg Orchestra's 1999 performance tour of Taiwan and the Orquesta Sinfónica de Trujillo (Peru). He has also appeared in various capacities at institutions including Western Michigan University, University of Wisconsin-River Falls, Valdosta State University, Stetson University, University of Central Florida, and the Conservatorio Regional de Música de Trujillo (Peru).

Takacs was associated with Iowa-based chamber ensemble Skyline Brass, circa 1999. He is an active member of the International Trumpet Guild and an Artist/Clinician for Edwards Trumpets.

References

External links
 Takacs WTAMU Home Page
 Edwards Trumpets William Takacs Page
 Skyline Brass ensemble
 Russian Trumpet Music – An Analysis of Concerti by Oskar Böhme, Eino Tamberg, and Sergeï Wassilenko Florida State University dissertation online, in PDF format

American trumpeters
American male trumpeters
1973 births
Living people
West Chester University alumni
Bowling Green State University alumni
Florida State University alumni
21st-century trumpeters
21st-century American male musicians